Rosa-Luxemburg-Platz, formerly the Bülowplatz, is a square in Berlin-Mitte, Germany.

History 
The square is dominated by the Volksbühne and by the Karl-Liebknecht-Haus, the headquarters of the German Left Party. The party's predecessor, the Communist Party of Germany (KPD), opened its headquarters on the square in 1926.

The square was previously named Babelsberger Platz (1907-1910) and Bülowplatz (1910-1933), and was the focus of one of the last mass demonstrations in Berlin against the Nazi Party on January 25, 1933—five days before Adolf Hitler was appointed German Chancellor. Later that year, with the rise of the Third Reich, it was renamed Horst-Wessel-Platz (1933-1945) after National Socialist martyr Horst Wessel. Following the fall of Berlin and Soviet occupation, the square, then part of communist-controlled East Berlin, was renamed Liebknechtplatz (1945-1947) after German communist Karl Liebknecht. It was then renamed Luxemburgplatz (1947-1969) after communist leader Rosa Luxemburg, until it was given the name Rosa-Luxemburg-Platz by the East German regime in 1969.

The square is noted as the scene of the murders of Paul Anlauf and Franz Lenck, police captains who were the victims of a double homicide in 1931 at the hands of members of the KPD. A monument created by Hans Dammann commemorating Anlauf and Lenck was erected in the square in 1934; although a metal statue of Anlauf and Lenck was melted down during the Second World War as part of a metal recycling campaign ("Metallspende des deutschen Volkes"), the rest of the monument was destroyed in 1950 on the orders of Erich Mielke, one of the murderers, who was by then a member of the Central Committee of the Socialist Unity Party of Germany and a State Secretary in the newly formed Ministry of State Security.

References

External links 
 Article from Luise-Berlin.de

Squares in Berlin
Buildings and structures in Mitte
Rosa Luxemburg